The First Man is a 2011 French-Italian drama film directed by Gianni Amelio and is based on the novel of the same name by Albert Camus.

Cast
 Jacques Gamblin as Jacques Cormery
 Catherine Sola as Catherine Cormery (1957)
 Maya Sansa as Catherine Cormery (1924)
 Denis Podalydès as Professor Bernard
 Régis Romele as the butcher
 Christophe Dimitri Réveille as Antoine

References

External links
 

2011 films
2011 drama films
French drama films
Italian drama films
2010s French-language films
Films based on works by Albert Camus
Films directed by Gianni Amelio
Films based on French novels
2010s French films
2010s Italian films